de Visser is a Dutch occupational surname meaning "the fisherman". Notable people with that name include:

 Eefje de Visser (born 1986), Dutch singer-songwriter
  (1857–1932), Dutch Minister of Science and Education
 Piet de Visser (football manager) (born 1934), Dutch football manager
 Piet de Visser (politician) (born 1931), Dutch politician

Dutch-language surnames
Occupational surnames